Georgina Walker is a female former international table tennis player from England.

Table tennis career
She represented England at two World Table Tennis Championships, in 2004 and 2006, in the Corbillon Cup (women's team event).

She competed in the 2002 and 2006 Commonwealth Games and won five English National Table Tennis Championships, (two senior and three junior). Her representative county was Nottinghamshire.

See also
 List of England players at the World Team Table Tennis Championships

References

English female table tennis players
Living people
1985 births
Table tennis players at the 2002 Commonwealth Games
Table tennis players at the 2006 Commonwealth Games
Commonwealth Games competitors for England